"Baroque Hoedown" is a song by the duet Perrey and Kingsley (formed by the French Jean-Jacques Perrey and the German-American Gershon Kingsley). Original from 1967 album Kaleidoscopic Vibrations a follow-up to their previous 1966 album, The In Sound From Way Out!. The two albums were reissued in 1988 on one compilation album entitled The Essential Perrey and Kingsley.

Recording 
The Moog synthesizer went on sale in 1967 and the duet Perrey and Kingsley they became the first to make recordings with the Moog synthesizer, predating 1968 album Switched-On Bach by Wendy Carlos that popularized the Moog synthesizer.

The Main Street Electrical Parade
Disneyland's vice president of entertainment Bob Jani had considered using the symphonic music from the movie Fantasia as the background music for the parade, but producer Jack Wagner felt the music should be electronic rather than orchestral. Wagner during his search for the theme to be used in the Main Street Electrical Parade, decided to listen to Perrey and Kingsley's "Kaleidoscopic Vibrations" (1967), and after a while he came across "Baroque Hoedown", which was chosen due to its ideal tempo for the parade choreography The Electrical Parade was originally created for Disneyland, debuting on June 17, 1972, and running there until November 25, 1996. During all that time, Perrey did not find out about the use of "Baroque Hoedown" until 1980:

In popular culture 
"Baroque Hoedown" was used as the final theme of the Mexican series El Chapulín Colorado starring the actor Chespirito. A version of the song was recorded by the Los Angeles Guitar Quartet in the style of Vivaldi for the 1995 album Heigh-Ho! Mozart.

See also 
 Main Street Electrical Parade
 Perrey and Kingsley

References

Disney theme park music
1967 compositions
Electronic songs
Gershon Kingsley songs
Jean-Jacques Perrey songs
Disneyland
French electronic songs